Room (formerly Room of One's Own) is a Canadian quarterly literary journal that features the work of emerging and established women and genderqueer writers and artists. Launched in Vancouver in 1975 by the West Coast Feminist Literary Magazine Society, or the Growing Room Collective, the journal has published an estimated 3,000 women, serving as an important launching pad for emerging writers. Room publishes short fiction, creative non-fiction, poetry, art, feature interviews, and features that promote dialogue between readers, writers and the collective, including "Roommate" (a profile of a Room reader or collective member) and "The Back Room" (back page interviews on feminist topics of interest). Collective members are regular participants in literary and arts festivals in Greater Vancouver and Toronto.

History
The journal's original title (1975-2006) Room of One's Own came from Virginia Woolf's essay A Room of One's Own. In 2007, the collective relaunched the magazine as Room, reflecting a more outward-facing, conversational editorial mandate; however, the original name and its inspiration is reflected in a quote from the Woolf essay that always appears on the back cover of the magazine.

Room magazine has always been operated by an editorial collective. Former collective members include author Gayla Reid, CBC broadcaster Eleanor Wachtel, University of British Columbia Press editor Jean Wilson, and Geist senior editor Mary Schendlinger.

Works that originally appeared in Room have been anthologized the Journey Prize Anthology, Best Canadian Poetry, Best Canadian Essays, and Best Canadian Stories, and have been nominated for National Magazine Awards.

Approximately 90% of the content Room publishes comes from unsolicited submissions.

Notable contributors
Past contributors to Room include Marian Engel, Carol Shields, Eden Robinson, Nalo Hopkinson, Larissa Lai, Lorna Crozier, Evelyn Lau, Ivan Coyote, Audrey Thomas, Kate Braid, Souvankham Thammavongsa, Susan Point, Hiromi Goto, Susan Musgrave, Shani Mootoo, Elizabeth Hay, Karen Solie, Erín Moure, Yasuko Thanh, Cynthia Flood, Gail Anderson-Dargatz, M. NourbeSe Philip, Daphne Marlatt, Bronwen Wallace, Carmen Aguirre, Ayelet Tsabari, Nancy Richler, Eliza Robertson, Carmen Rodríguez, Marie Annharte Baker, Betsy Warland, Lydia Kwa, and Elizabeth Bachinsky, among many other acclaimed writers and artists. Recent issues have included interviews with Ursula K. Le Guin, Miriam Toews, Joy Kogawa, Lisa Charleyboy, Stacey McKenzie, d'bi young, Jillian Tamaki, Janie Chang, and Mariko Tamaki.

Writing contests
Room currently offers four writing contests, which are open to both Canadian and international writers who identify as women or genderqueer. The deadline for the fiction and poetry contests is in mid-July, while the deadline for the creative non-fiction contest is currently on 8 March, which is also International Women's Day. The creative non-fiction contest was originally added to the other two genres in 2008, and moved to the March deadline starting in 2015.

In 2016, Room launched their first Short Forms Contest, a multi-genre / genre-blending contest for flash fiction, flash CNF, and prose poetry of 500 words and under, with an inaugural deadline of 15 January 2017.

In addition to offering contests, Room presents one contributor each year with a $500 Emerging Writer Award.

Cover art contest
In 2015, Room introduced a cover art contest with a deadline of 30 November.

Making Room: Forty Years of Room Magazine 
In 2017, Room published the anthology, Making Room: Forty Years of Room Magazine. The anthology contains a selection of works featured in Room between 1975 and 2016. The anthology is broken up chronologically and follows Canadian feminist writing throughout different eras of feminism. 80 pieces are featured in Making Room. The Making Room project was coordinated by Meghan Bell.

Anthology contributors 

 Carmen Aguirre
 Najwa Ali
 Gail Anderson-Dargatz
 Elizabeth Bachinsky
 Marie Annharte Baker
 Juliane Okot Bitek
 Monique Bosco
 Kate Braid
 Nicole Brossard
 Cyndia Cole
 Ivan Coyote
 Lucas Crawford
 Su Croll
 Lynn Crosbie
 Lorna Crozier
 Danielle Daniel
 Amber Dawn
 Junie Désil
 Sandy Frances Duncan
 Dorothy Elias
 Christine Estima
 Tanya Evanson
 barbara findlay
 Cynthia Flood
 Chantal Gibson
 Leona Gom
 Jane Eaton Hamilton
 Wasela Hiyate
 Nancy Holmes
 Anna Humphrey
 Mindy Hung
 Carole Itter
 Amy Jones
 Helen Kuk
 Matea Kulić
 Naoko Kumagai
 Fiona Tinwei Lam
 Doretta Lau
 Evelyn Lau
 Jen Sookfong Lee
 Tracey Lindberg
 Dorothy Livesay
 Annabel Lyon
 Vera Manuel
 Daphne Marlatt
 Robin Blackburn McBride
 Carmelita McGrath
 Cara-Lyn Morgan
 Erín Moure
 Susan Musgrave
 Alessandra Naccarato
 Kellee Ngan
 Monica Pacheco
 M. NourbeSe Philip
 Helen Potrebenko
 Sina Queyras
 Eden Robinson
 Constance Rooke
 Rebecca Rosenblum
 Devyani Saltzman
 Sigal Samuel
 Nilofar Shidmehr
 Carol Shields
 Serena Shipp
 Carolyn Smart
 Susan Stenson
 Anna Swanson
 Souvankham Thammavongsa
 Audrey Thomas
 Ayelet Tsabari
 Chimwemwe Undi
 Eleanor Wachtel
 Betsy Warland
 jia qing wilson-yang

Growing Room Festival 
Room launched Growing Room: A Feminist Literary Festival in 2017. The first festival was planned to celebrate both Room's 40th anniversary and International Women's Day and ran from 8 to 12 March in Vancouver, British Columbia. Growing Room features panels and from female and genderqueer Canadian writers as well as dancing and music.

The 2018 iteration of Growing Room was held from 1 to 4 March of that year. The 2019 festival was held from 8 to 17 March and featured approximately 100 writers and over 50 events. Growing Room 2020 was cancelled due to COVID-19.

See also

 List of literary magazines
 List of literary awards honoring women

References

External links

Records of Room of One's Own are held by Simon Fraser University's Special Collections and Rare Books

1975 establishments in British Columbia
Canadian literary awards
Feminism in Canada
Feminist magazines
Literary awards honoring women
Literary awards by magazines and newspapers
Literary magazines published in Canada
Magazines established in 1975
Magazines published in Vancouver
Quarterly magazines published in Canada
Women in British Columbia